Hamish Arbeb Gervais Anthony (born 16 January 1971) is a former West Indian cricketer. As a fast bowling allrounder, Anthony played for both the West Indies and the United States. He also featured for the Leeward Islands and Welsh side Glamorgan.

Cricket career
Born in Urlings Village, Antigua, Anthony joined Glamorgan in 1990, after being recommended by his fellow countryman Viv Richards. Anthony scored two half centuries and picked up 56 wickets at an average of 33.36 in his 20 first class games for Glamorgan. He also snared 19 wickets at an average of 29.21 from a sum of 16 list A games for the Welsh side.

Anthony played for the Windies' in their 1991 tour of England. He later featured for the regional team in two one dayers at Sharjah Cricket Stadium and in the 1996/97 Hong Kong Sixes. In June 2005 Anthony was picked by the United States in their squad for the 2005 ICC Trophy. During the tournament, he took 5 for 46 against the UAE in an eventual losing effort.

Personal life
Anthony is the cousin of fellow Leeward Islands cricketer George Ferris.

References

1971 births
Living people
Antigua and Barbuda cricketers
West Indies One Day International cricketers
Glamorgan cricketers
Leeward Islands cricketers
American cricketers
Marylebone Cricket Club cricketers
Cricketers at the 1998 Commonwealth Games
United States Virgin Islands cricketers
Antigua and Barbuda emigrants to the United States Virgin Islands
People from Saint Mary Parish, Antigua
Commonwealth Games competitors for Antigua and Barbuda